Albert Gray or Grey may refer to:

Albert L. Gray (1847–1916), Canadian-born American dry goods merchant and Wisconsin Assemblyman
Bert Gray (1900–1969), Welsh international footballer
Albert Grey, 4th Earl Grey (1851–1917), British nobleman and politician who served as Governor General of Canada
Albert Alexander Gray (1868–1936), British physician and otologist